The Pac-12 Network (P12N), sometimes referred to as Pac-12 Networks, is an American sports-oriented digital cable and satellite television network owned by the Pac-12 Conference. The network's studio and production facilities are headquartered in the South of Market district of San Francisco, California.

In addition to the national channel, it also operates a group of six regional sports channels focusing on different schools within the conference under the Pac-12 Networks brand:
 Pac-12 Arizona, featuring events from the University of Arizona and Arizona State University
 Pac-12 Bay Area, featuring events from the University of California and Stanford University
 Pac-12 Los Angeles, featuring events from UCLA and University of Southern California
 Pac-12 Mountain, featuring events from the University of Colorado and University of Utah
 Pac-12 Oregon, featuring events from the University of Oregon and Oregon State University
 Pac-12 Washington, featuring events from the University of Washington and Washington State University

History
Announced on July 27, 2011 and launched on August 15, 2012, the national network was available to at least 48 million pay television households in the United States at the time of its debut, while the regional networks are available in all providers within their respective Pac-12 regional territory. It is the third sports network to be devoted to a specific collegiate athletic conference (after the Big Ten Network and the now-defunct MountainWest Sports Network) and the first to be owned by a conference outright without support from outside companies (Fox Entertainment Group owns 49% of Big Ten Network, while the defunct MountainWest Sports Network had CBS and Comcast as partners, and SEC Network and ACC Network are wholly owned by ESPN).

The networks feature 24-hour coverage of Pac-12 sanctioned sporting events, including Olympic sports as well as broadcasts of archived sports telecasts. The contract ensures that every football and men's basketball game is televised nationally. Sports not featured on the national Pac-12 Network are instead carried through the regional networks as well as on the Pac-12 Digital Network, which was launched the same day.

On June 10, 2012, the Pac-12 Conference announced a partnership with pay-per-view service In Demand and Comcast Media Center (CMC) that would provide the networks with technical support, video on demand services, and support for TV Everywhere services. The infrastructure of the Pac-12 Networks, 12 member institutions and CMC's operations in Denver, Colorado are connected via fiber network. Master control origination services, including compression and satellite front-haul services, satellite receiver authorizations, and disaster recovery are also run through the CMC in Denver. The following month on July 22, the Pac-12 Conference announced an additional partnership with In-Demand, that would provide mobile production facilities and below-the-line crews for all 12 schools in the conference.

The Pac-12's next media rights for football and men's basketball will begin in 2024. In July 2022, amid a conference realignment that will see UCLA and USC move to the Big Ten at that time, Pat Forde reported that there had been early discussions over the future of the Pac-12 Networks, including the possibility of moving its content to a rebranded ACC Network (which has wider carriage than Pac-12 Networks).

Programming
The Pac-12 Networks produce telecasts of roughly 850 collegiate events each year (350 events on Pac-12's national network, and 500 events carried on Pac-12 regional networks). The national network includes 35 football games, 100 men's basketball games and 40 women's basketball games on an annual basis. The Pac-12 national network also features all spring football games, coaches shows, and news conferences. The Pac-12 network has also shown rugby matches played by schools from the PAC Rugby Conference, even though college rugby is not a sport sanctioned by the NCAA.

Original programs broadcast by the networks include:
 Pac-12 Sports Report - A weekly studio show discussing and highlighting the Pac-12 events of the week
 Inside Pac-12 Football - A weekly studio show breaking down football news from around the Pac-12 
 The Drive - A weekly docu-series that provides a behind-the-scenes look inside Pac-12 football and men's basketball programs
 Pac-12 Classics - A replay of classic Pac-12 games and events which includes commentary from the players and coaches involved 
 Pac-12 Encore - A replay of recent Pac-12 games or events
 Pac-12 Playbook - A weekly football coaches show (No longer airing as of 2013)
 The 12 Best - A series that counts down the top 12 conference sports moments within various categories
 Varsity Days - A program featuring footage of Pac-12 athletes and coaches
 Timelines - A 12-installment series chronicling sports moments from the previous year for each Pac-12 school
 Conference of Champions - A non-sports program that profiles current students in various features.

Carriage
The original announcement of the Pac-12 Networks' launch on July 27, 2011 included the announcement of carriage agreements with four major cable providers, Comcast, Time Warner Cable, Cox Communications and Bright House Networks to carry the Pac-12 Network and Pac-12 Digital Network at launch. The agreements did not guarantee that the Pac-12 Networks would be available in all areas within the territory of a Pac-12 university, and a minimum of 40 million homes nationally at launch date. The agreements complemented a 12-year deal that the Pac-12 Conference had struck with Fox Sports and ESPN that began in 2012. In addition, the network entered into extended negotiations with satellite providers. Pac-12 commissioner Larry Scott stated in a May 8, 2012 interview with sports radio station KJR in Seattle that he is "quietly optimistic" that deals with providers would be made in time for the channel's planned fall 2012 launch. As of September 7, 2013, the Pac-12 Network has not yet signed carriage deals with DirecTV, Charter Communications and Verizon FiOS. 

On July 20, 2012, the Pac-12 Conference announced a long-term agreement with the National Cable Television Cooperative (NCTC), a cooperative of 900 mostly smaller and rural cable providers, allowing any member of the NCTC access to carry one or more of the Pac-12 Network as well as providing access to the Pac-12 Digital Network through the NCTC WTVE TV Everywhere platform. In an August 10, 2012 conference, the conference announced that NCTC members Strata Networks and All West Communications in Utah, San Bruno Cable in the San Francisco Bay Area, GCI in Alaska, LocalTel Communications in Wenatchee, WA and Ashland Communications in Oregon had agreed to carry the Pac-12 Network. On July 28, 2012, Frontier Communications announced on one of its official Facebook accounts that the company would carry the channel on Frontier FiOS TV.  The deal was officially announced on August 1, 2012.

Several smaller providers reached carriage agreements with the network during the month of August 2012. On August 1, Oregon-based cable providers BendBroadband announced an intention to carry the Pac-12 Network as well as the Pac-12 Digital Network on their "bendbroadband2go" TV Everywhere platform. Two days later on August 3, 2012, Arizona-based Western Broadband and Orbitel Communications announced their intent to carry the Pac-12 Arizona Network. On August 6, Astound Broadband announced an intention to carry the Pac-12 Bay Area Network. A day later on August 7, Wave Broadband announced an intention to carry the Pac-12 Bay Area, Oregon, and Washington Networks. On August 8, 2012, CC Communications announced its intent to carry the Pac-12 National Network and one Pac-12 regional channel (on August 30, 2012, CC Communications began carrying the Pac-12 Mountain network, in addition to the national network). Click! Network also revealed on their official Facebook page that it would carry the Pac-12 Network. On August 21, 2012, Canby Telecom announced an intention to carry the Pac-12 National Network as well as all Pac-12 regional networks.

On September 8, 2012, Dish Network announced that it would carry the Pac-12 National Network starting on September 8. To date, it is the only satellite carrier to have struck a carriage agreement with the Pac-12 Networks, and was the largest pay television provider to reach a carriage deal during 2012, bringing the Pac-12 Networks' national coverage to approximately 60 million households. On February 1, 2016, however, Pac-12 restricted access to the regional channels for DISH subscribers. On October 10, 2012, the conference came to an agreement with Consolidated Communications for its SureWest Communications system in Northern California to carry the Pac-12 Networks Bay Area regional service. On September 6, 2013, Pac-12 Networks entered into a deal with AT&T U-verse to carry the main feed on channel 759 (as well as on channel 760 in the San Francisco Bay Area, and on channel 761 in Los Angeles).

As of 2015, the Pac-12 Networks were "available in" 90 million homes, but about 12 million actually subscribed to the network, according to SNL Kagan.  On February 10, 2016, the Canadian Radio-television and Telecommunications Commission on behalf of Jessop & Proulx LLP, added Pac-12 Network to its list of foreign broadcasters that are allowed to be carried by Canadian pay television providers.  By the end of 2016, Pac-12 Network had carriage deals with Charter Communications in Los Angeles and Dallas, Frontier FiOS, and streaming service Sling TV, but still had not come to terms with DirecTV.  In August 2017, the Pac-12 Networks were added to FuboTV.

On November 28, 2018, it was reported that the Pac-12 Networks will no longer be available on AT&T U-verse as of December 2, 2018.  Approximately 19 million homes were subscribed to the network in 2018, according to SNL Kagan.

In March 2019, Pac-12 Network announced partnerships with the Seven Network's 7plus streaming service in Australia, and DAZN in Canada, to carry programming from the service.

As of August 2019, an agreement with DirecTV still had not been reached. Pac-12 Networks president Mark Shuken stated “Our presidents, our athletic directors, when we talk, we talk about skating to where the puck’s going, not where it’s been" referring to the decline of satellite TV and the rise of streaming services.

On-air staff

Current on-air staff

 Basketball and football

 Roxy Bernstein – football and basketball game announcer
 Lisa Byington – football and basketball game announcer
 Kevin Calabro – football and basketball game announcer
 Rich Cellini – football and basketball game announcer
 Aaron Goldsmith - football and basketball game announcer
 Guy Haberman - football and basketball game announcer
 Greg Heister - football and basketball game announcer
 Jordan Kent - track and field, football and basketball game announcer
 J. B. Long - basketball and football game announcer
 Ted Robinson – lead football and basketball game announcer
 Mark Rogondino – soccer and basketball game announcer
 Paul Sunderland – basketball game announcer
 Jim Watson – basketball game announcer
 Ron Pitts – football game announcer
 Glenn Parker – lead football game analyst
 Curtis Conway – studio football analyst
 Ronnie Lott – studio football analyst
 Jeremy Bloom – football game/studio analyst
 Nigel Burton – football game analyst
 Jake Plummer – studio football analyst
 Yogi Roth – football game/studio analyst
 Ben Braun - men's basketball analyst
 P.J. Carlesimo - men's basketball analyst
 Jarron Collins – men's basketball analyst
 Dan Dickau – men's basketball analyst
 Sean Elliott - men's basketball analyst
 Doug Gottlieb - men's basketball analyst
 Lamar Hurd - men's basketball analyst
 Ernie Kent – men's basketball analyst
 Steve Lavin - former men's basketball analyst
 Matt Muehlebach - men's basketball analyst
 Don Maclean – lead men's basketball analyst
 Mary Murphy – women's basketball analyst
 Kevin O'Neill - men's basketball analyst
 Bill Walton – men's basketball analyst

 Other sports

 Mike Yam – former studio host/news anchor
 Anne Marie Anderson – women's sports game announcer
 Kevin Barnett – volleyball game announcer
 Krista Blunk – women's sports game announcer
 Jason Knapp – water polo and lacrosse announcer
 Ato Boldon – track and field analyst
 Eric Byrnes – baseball game analyst
 Justin Gimelstob – tennis analyst
 Cobi Jones – soccer analyst
 Holly McPeak – sand volleyball analyst
 Al Scates – men's volleyball analyst
 J. T. Snow – baseball game analyst
 Kevin Stocker – baseball game analyst
 Kevin Wong – men's volleyball analyst

Executive personnel
 Larry Scott - Pac-12 Commissioner, Executive Chairman of Pac-12 Enterprises
 Mark Shuken - President, Pac-12 Networks

Member institution contributions
 The UCLA Music Department helps with the networks' on-air music production
 Arizona State University and Washington State University provide access to their digital imaging libraries
 USC Annenberg School for Communication and Journalism at the University of Southern California also provides contributions

Online services

Pac-12 Now
On June 8, 2012, Pac-12 Enterprises announced a partnership with Ooyala to develop the Pac-12 Digital Network, branded as Pac-12 Now, which serves as the TV Everywhere platform for the Pac-12 Network. Pac-12 Now is available through web browsers, mobile and iOS devices, with content accessible via a login through a pay television provider. The Pac-12 Digital Network broadcasts 800 live sporting events, including Olympic sports, 30 football games and 130 men's basketball games annually. Video on demand content, including recent and classic events, are also available on the service.

Pac-12 Plus
In June 2016, Pac-12 Enterprises announced that social network Twitter will broadcast least 150 live games in the 2016-2017 season under the brand Pac-12 Plus. The service will not feature college football or basketball, but less prominent sports like soccer, baseball, softball, ice hockey, gymnastics, swimming and track and field.

Strike
On December 8, 2012, the International Alliance of Theatrical Stage Employees (IATSE) declared a strike against the network, citing the hiring of non-union television crews at lower wages at many of the twelve campus sites. The strike ended 10 days later.

See also
The following channels also exclusively air collegiate sporting events:
 ACC Network - shows sports involving the Atlantic Coast Conference
 Big Ten Network - shows sports involving the Big Ten Conference
 SEC Network - shows sports involving the Southeastern Conference
 Longhorn Network - shows sports and programming involving the University of Texas at Austin
 ESPNU - a national network focusing on sports from several collegiate athletic conferences
 Stadium College Sports - a slate of three regional networks focusing on sports from a variety of collegiate athletic conferences
 MountainWest Sports Network - a defunct network that carried sports involving the Mountain West Conference

References

Television channels and stations established in 2012
Sports television networks in the United States
English-language television stations in the United States
Television networks in the United States
College sports television networks
Network
Sports in San Francisco
Sports in the San Francisco Bay Area
College basketball on television in the United States
College football on television